First Under the Wire is the fifth studio album by Australian group Little River Band, released in July 1979 by Capitol Records. The album peaked at No. 2 on the Australian Kent Music Report Albums Chart and at No. 10 on the Billboard 200, becoming the group's highest charting album in that territory. The album included two top 10 Billboard Hot 100 hits in "Lonesome Loser" and "Cool Change".

Reception
Cash Box magazine said "Ringing harmonies are the Little River Band's forte, and its resonant vocal arrangements are in full bloom on First Under the Wire. John Boylan's sterling production adds lustre to the songs, and David Briggs brilliant guitar work continues to be the group's musical focal point." calling the album "A must for AOR, MOR and pop programmers."

Mark Allan from Allmusic gave the album four stars.

Track listing 
 Side A
"Lonesome Loser" (David Briggs) - 3:58
"The Rumour" (Glenn Shorrock) - 4:18
"By My Side" (Beeb Birtles, Graham Goble) - 4:25
"Cool Change" (Glenn Shorrock) - 5:14
"It's Not a Wonder" (Graham Goble) - 3:56

 Side B
"Hard Life" (Prelude) (David Briggs) - 2:42
"Hard Life" (Graham Goble) - 4:46
"Middle Man" (Beeb Birtles, Graham Goble) - 4:24
"Man on the Run" (Beeb Birtles, Graham Goble) - 4:16
"Mistress of Mine" (Graham Goble) - 5:32

Personnel
 Glenn Shorrock - lead vocals (except as noted)
 David Briggs - lead guitars, Roland synthesizer guitars, Electric Sitar on track 10 
 Beeb Birtles - electric and acoustic guitars, vocals, lead vocals on tracks 3 and 9, co-lead vocals on track 8
 Graham Goble - electric and acoustic guitars, backing vocals, vocal arrangements
 Derek Pellicci - Sonor and Syndrums drums, percussion
 Clive Harrison - bass guitar (tracks 1, 2, 5, 9 and 10)
 Mike Clarke - bass (tracks 3, 4, 6, 7, 8 and 10)
 Peter Sullivan - piano (tracks 1, 2, 5, 9)
 Peter Jones - piano and keyboards (tracks 3, 4, 6, 7, 8 and 10) and orchestrations 
 Bill Harrower - saxophones on tracks 4 and 8
 John Boylan - acoustic guitar on track 2

Charts

Certifications

References 

1979 albums
Little River Band albums
albums produced by John Boylan (record producer)
Capitol Records albums